Mont Gelé is a mountain of the Pennine Alps, part of the Municipality Riddes and overlooking Verbier in the Swiss canton of Valais. Located on the range north of Mont Fort, its summit is the tripoint between the municipalities (and valleys) of Bagnes, Riddes and Nendaz. It is one of the two mountains named Mont Gelé in the valley of Bagnes, the other being located on the Italian border.

In winter, Mont-Gelé summit can be reached from Verbier (or Siviez / Nendaz) through aerial cable-car. It is also possible to go down the mountain by two official but off-piste ski slopes, for good skiers only.

See also
List of mountains of Switzerland accessible by public transport

References

External links

 Mont Gelé on Hikr

Mountains of the Alps
Alpine three-thousanders
Mountains of Switzerland
Cable cars in Switzerland
Mountains of Valais
Bagnes